Play-through or play through may refer to:

Sports
 Play through, a verb which in golfing describes the act of a faster group of golfers passing a slower group on a golf course

Videos and video games
Replay value or play-through, a video game's attribute of being playable repeatedly while still being enjoyable
Video game walkthrough or play-through, video footage of a video game being played